Louisburg College is a private Methodist-affiliated two-year college in Louisburg, North Carolina.

History 
Louisburg College has its roots in two schools: Franklin Male Academy, which was chartered in 1787, re-chartered in 1802 but held its first recorded classes on January 1, 1805; and Louisburg Female College, which was founded in 1857, succeeding a previous institution, Louisburg Female Academy, founded in 1814.

Louisburg Female Academy opened its doors in 1815, under the direction of Harriet Partridge, making it one of the oldest institutions of higher education for women.  From 1843–1856, Asher H. Ray and his wife Jane Curtis Ray were highly successful as principals of the female academy, which in the 1850s was called Louisburg Female Seminary. Among the courses offered by the seminary were history, botany, algebra, rhetoric, chemistry, geology, logic, French, Latin, Greek, guitar, and calisthenics. The respected reputation of the seminary contributed to a movement to establish a female college.

In 1855, the property of Louisburg Female Academy was transferred to the Louisburg Female College Company; the newly formed body, Louisburg Female College, opened its doors in 1857. A four-story, fifty-room brick Greek Revival-style building for the female college was constructed in 1857 on the west campus where the female academy building had formerly stood. Old Main, the central building of the Female Academy is still in use today as the administrative building of Louisburg College.  Old Main was listed on the National Register of Historic Places in 1978. It is located in the Louisburg Historic District.

In August 1857, Louisburg Female College opened its doors under the management of Professor James P. Nelson. Course offerings included French, Spanish, Italian, piano, guitar, drawing, painting, and needlework. The female college continued to operate during the Civil War under presidents C.C. Andrews (1860–1861) and James Southgate, Jr. (1862–1865). After the war, about 500 Union soldiers camped in the college during May and June 1865.

During the administration of Dr. Turner Myrick Jones (1866–1868), former president of Greensboro Female College, enrollment grew to 133 students. The regular college course in 1867 included such courses as English grammar, mythology, geography, botany, physiology, trigonometry, Latin, French, and "Evidence of Christianity."

After the College opened and closed several times during the 1870s and 1880s, S.D. Bagley became president in 1889. Matthew S. Davis, who had previously served twenty-five years as principal of the male academy, became president of the female college in 1896 and held the office until his death in 1906. He was succeeded by his daughter, Mary Davis Allen (Mrs. Ivey Allen), who was president until 1917.

At the beginning of the twentieth century, a number of significant changes took place. The institution became known as Louisburg College, and the college became officially linked to the Methodist Church. Washington Duke, the Durham philanthropist, had acquired ownership of the college property in the 1890s; after his death, his son Benjamin N. Duke presented the property to the North Carolina Conference of the Methodist Church.

Other changes in the early twentieth century included the erection of the three-story Davis Building, named in memory of Matthew S. Davis, and the reorganization of the college into an institution with junior college rating (1914–1915).

During the presidency of Arthur D. Mohn in the 1920s, Louisburg College experienced a period of building expansion. The West Wing of Main Building, the Pattie Julia Wright Dormitory, and the Franklin County Building were constructed. Unfortunately, a disastrous fire gutted Main Building and the new West Wing in 1928. Closely following the fire came the Great Depression, and the college was burdened with debt and a shrinking enrollment.

The Reverend Armour David Wilcox, former minister of the Louisburg Methodist Church, served as president of the college from 1931 to 1937. Louisburg College became co-educational in 1931, and student enrollment immediately increased. By the end of World War II, institutional debts had been paid. Walter Patten served as president from 1939–1947 and Samuel M. Holton from 1947–1955. In 1952, Louisburg College was accredited by the Southern Association of Colleges and Schools.

In 1956, a planning committee of the North Carolina Conference of the Methodist Church recommended the establishment of two co-educational senior colleges and the merger of Louisburg College into one of the institutions. The college alumni and the citizens of Franklin County joined to oppose the merger. A "Keep Louisburg at Home" campaign emphasized the depth of local support for the junior college. The Conference decided, in response to this endeavor, to retain Louisburg College as an accredited junior college.

A period of revitalization and growth occurred during the administration of president Cecil W. Robbins (1955–1974). Student enrollment, faculty size, budget, and physical plant were significantly increased and improved. In 1961, the college purchased the Mills High School property on the east side of Main Street; the Mills Building was remodeled to serve as the college auditorium-classroom building. During the Robbins administration, four dormitories, a library, a cafeteria and a student center were constructed.

From 1975 to 1992, Dr. J. Allen Norris, Jr. served as college president. The Board of Trustees initiated the Third Century Campaign in 1980. The $4.2 million goal of the first phase of the campaign was surpassed, resulting in the construction of the E. Hoover Taft, Jr. Classroom Building. Through the generosity of the United Methodist Men of the Raleigh District, the Clifton L. Benson Chapel and Religious Life Center was opened in 1986. A new auditorium and theater complex was also constructed.

During the 1986–87 school year, Louisburg College held a Bicentennial Celebration in recognition of its unique two-hundred-year heritage. The first college flag was designed and displayed during the celebration, and the first published history of the college, Louisburg College Echoes, was issued in 1988.

Campus 
Louisburg College consists of 20 major buildings.  It sits on the north side of the city on 75 acres of land with Main Street running through the middle, dividing campus into West Campus and East Campus.

Academics 
Students can earn degrees in three different fields including the Associate of Arts in General College, the Associate of Science in General Science, and the Associate of Science in Business.  Students can take additional coursework in disciplines such as the expressive arts and education.

Athletics 
The Louisburg College Hurricanes rosters 14 varsity athletic teams; Men's and Women's Basketball, Men's and Women's Soccer, Men's and Women's Cross Country/Track, Baseball, Softball, Women's Volleyball, Football, Esports, and Cheerleading. Louisburg competes in the NJCAA in varying divisions depending on team.

Notable people 

Archibald Hunter Arrington ‘18 – politician, County Commissioner in 1868
Ellis Credle ‘22 – author, Down Down the Mountain 
Joseph J. Davis ’48 – politician and lawyer – US House of Representatives, 1875

Sports 

Bill Moran ‘71 –  baseball player Boston Red Sox
Mike Dement ‘74 – basketball coach, UNCG
Ron Musselman ‘75 –  baseball player, RHP, Seattle Mariners
Mark Funderburk ‘76 –  baseball player, OF, Minnesota Twins
Kelly Heath ‘77 –  baseball player, 2B, Kansas City Royals
Brian Holton ‘78 –  baseball player, RHP, Los Angeles Dodgers
Otis Nixon ‘79 –  baseball player, CF, Yankees and others
Greg Briley ‘85 –  baseball player, PH/ OF, Seattle Mariners
Theodore “Blue” Edwards ‘86 – basketball player, 1st round pick of Utah Jazz, 1989
Russell Scott Riggs ‘91 – NASCAR driver
Chad Fonville ‘92 –  baseball player, San Francisco Giants 
Travis Cherry ‘96 – Music producer, musician and songwriter
Josh Rupe ‘02 –  baseball player, Chicago White Sox 
Ian Drew Thomas ‘07 –  baseball player, Atlanta Braves
Paul Clemens ’08 –  baseball player, Atlanta Braves and San Diego Padres
 Billy McShepard '09, basketball player in the Israeli National League
Forrayah Bass ‘13 – soccer player, San Diego State 
Jarrell Arnold - soccer player, United States Virgin Islands
Eric Bullock – baseball player, Houston Astros
Bryan Little – baseball player, Montreal Expos 
Boyce Cedric Mullins II '14, Baltimore Orioles

References

External links

 Official website
 Louisburg College student yearbooks on DigitalNC.org

 
1787 establishments in North Carolina
Buildings and structures in Franklin County, North Carolina
Education in Franklin County, North Carolina
Educational institutions established in 1814
Two-year colleges in the United States
Universities and colleges accredited by the Southern Association of Colleges and Schools
Universities and colleges in the Research Triangle
University and college buildings on the National Register of Historic Places in North Carolina
Greek Revival architecture in North Carolina
School buildings completed in 1857
National Register of Historic Places in Franklin County, North Carolina
NJCAA athletics
Individually listed contributing properties to historic districts on the National Register in North Carolina
Private universities and colleges in North Carolina